11P/Tempel–Swift–LINEAR is a periodic Jupiter-family comet in the Solar System.

Ernst Wilhelm Leberecht Tempel (Marseille) originally discovered the comet on November 27, 1869, it was later observed by Lewis Swift (Warner Observatory) on October 11, 1880, and realised to be the same comet.

After 1908 the comet became an unobservable lost comet, but on December 7, 2001, an object was found by the Lincoln Near-Earth Asteroid Research (LINEAR) program, and confirmed by previous images from September 10 and October 17 as being the same comet. The comet was not observed during the 2008 unfavorable apparition because the perihelion passage occurred when the comet was on the far side of the Sun. The comet was observed during the 2014 and 2020 apparitions.

References

External links 
 Orbital simulation from JPL (Java) / Horizons Ephemeris
 11P at Kronk's Cometography

Periodic comets
0011

Comets in 2014
18691127